Meet the Missus is an American comedy film released in 1940. The eighth in the 1938–41 nine-film Higgins Family series, this entry features Alan Ladd in a small role.

Plot
Valentine's Day is approaching fast, when Joe Higgins gets a call from his boss, Mr. Simpson, interrupting the grand preparations for the celebration. It turns out that $5,000 in bonds, that was supposed to be paid as a security for the company through Sidney Higgins, Joe's son, haven't been delivered. When Joe confronts Sid about the money, it turns out they are lost. A desperate search for the money begins, and the last time the papers were seen was in the hands of little Millie Lou, the neighbor's daughter, as she picked them up, but she is now gone too.

John Williams, who is Joe's daughter Betty Higgins' boyfriend, and a lawyer, tells Sid that the loss of the bonds papers could ultimately send him to jail. To save their son from incarceration, Joe and his wife Lil try to borrow money as collateral, first by taking a loan at the bank, which doesn't work, and then by getting grandpa Ed to marry a rich woman. The woman, Ella Jones, has been after Ed a long time, but he isn't interested the least to marry her.

Ed agrees to try, and writes a love letter to Ella, confessing his love for her. The letter is then delivered by Millie Lou before Joe can give Ed the good news that the bank loan has been approved, and he doesn't have to marry Ella. When Ed tries to explain to Ella that he changed his mind, she is very upset and threatens to sue him.

John tells Ed to either pay the money or get the letter, the proof, back. Ed chooses the latter alternative, and that night, he and Joe break into Ella's apartment to steal it back. The attempt results in disaster, and Joe is arrested when he enters the wrong apartment by mistake. A neighbor, Violet Stevens is also arrested, since she was fighting Elmer, her boyfriend, when Joe entered her apartment. Joe and Violet have to spend the night together in jail, making his wife Lil jealous.

When everything is explained and sorted out, and Joe and Violet are out of jail again, Elmer agrees to help Joe out with a loan.

Despite the confusion, Violet and Joe convince Elmer and Lil of their innocence, and Elmer even offers to help Joe secure the loan. But soon after this Violet is stuck with her dress in a car door, and Joe is the only person around to help her get a new dress. They are spotted by Elmer, Lil, Ed and Ella as they run into the building. Ella drops her lawsuit because the family seems too deranged for her taste.

The story ends with Joe and Ed sitting outside an igloo by the Arctic pole. They hear over the radio that Sid has finally found the bonds, and that they are forgiven by their family and expected to return home.

Cast
Roscoe Karns as Joe Higgins
Ruth Donnelly as Lil Higgins
Spencer Charters as Grandpa [Ed Carson]
George Ernest as Sidney Higgins
Lois Ranson as Betty Higgins
Polly Moran as Ella Jones
Astrid Allwyn as Violet Stevens
Alan Ladd as John Williams
Harry Woods as Elmer Shillingford
Dorothy Ann Seese as Millie Lou
Harry Tyler as Mr. Godfrey
Lillian Yarbo as Maid (uncredited)

References

External links

Meet the Missus at TV Guide (1987 write-up was originally published in The Motion Picture Guide)

1940 films
1940 comedy films
Films directed by Malcolm St. Clair
Films produced by Robert North
American comedy films
American black-and-white films
1940s English-language films
Republic Pictures films
1940s American films